The Kyrgyzstan competed at the 2018 Asian Games in Jakarta and Palembang, Indonesia, from 18 August to 2 September 2018. Kyrgyzstan made its first appearance at the Asian Games in 1994 Hiroshima, and the best achievement was in the 2002 Busan, with a gold, 5 silver and 6 bronze medals. At the last edition in Incheon, Kyrgyzstan managed to claim 2 silver and 4 bronze medals.

Medalists

The following Kyrgyzstan competitors won medals at the Games.

|  style="text-align:left; width:78%; vertical-align:top;"|

|  style="text-align:left; width:22%; vertical-align:top;"|

Competitors 
The following is a list of the number of competitors representing Kyrgyzstan that participated at the Games:

Demonstration events

Archery 

Recurve

Athletics 

Kyrgyzstan entered nine athletes (4 men's and 5 women's) to participate in the athletics competition at the Games.

Basketball 

Summary

3x3 basketball
Kyrgyzstan national 3x3 team participated in the Games, the men's team placed in the pool B based on the FIBA 3x3 federation ranking.

Men's tournament

Roster
The following is the Kyrgyzstan roster in the men's 3x3 basketball tournament of the 2018 Asian Games.
Omurbek Atabekov (7)
Sherzat Kenenov (8)
Artem Mushtruev (23)
Roman Demchenko (24)

Pool B

Boxing 

Men

Women

Canoeing

Slalom

Sprint

Cycling

Road

Equestrian 

Jumping

# – indicates that the score of this rider does not count in the team competition, since only the best three results of a team are counted.

Esports (demonstration) 

Hearthstone

Fencing 

Individual

Team

Football 

Kyrgyzstan men's team entered the group E.

Summary

Men's tournament

Roster

Group E

Gymnastics

Ju-jitsu 

Men

Judo 

Kyrgyzstan put up 8 (6 men's and 2 women's) athletes for judo competition at the Games.

Men

Women

Karate

Kurash 

Men

Modern pentathlon

Pencak silat 

Tanding

Sambo

Shooting 

Men

Women

Swimming

Men

Women

Table tennis 

Individual

Team

Tennis 

Men

Women

Volleyball 

Kyrgyzstan Volleyball Federation will sent the men's team squad under the captain Kanybek Uulu Onelbek who will compete in pool A at the Games.

Indoor volleyball

Men's tournament

Team roster
The following is the Kyrgyzstan roster in the men's volleyball tournament of the 2018 Asian Games.

Head coach: Andrei Akkudinov

Pool A

13th–20th quarterfinal

13th–16th semifinal

15th place match

Weightlifting

Uzbekistan weightlifter clinched five medals at the Games.
Ruslan Nurudinov who competed in men's −105 kg broke the Asian Games record in clean and jerk by lifting 230 kg, and also in total lifting 421 kg.

Men

Women

Wrestling 

Kyrgyzstan wrestler won 8 medals at the Games. The team captured 4 medals (2 silver and 2 bronze), in the Greco-Roman and freestyle events respectively.

Men's freestyle

Men's Greco-Roman

Women's freestyle

Wushu 

Sanda

Key: * TV – Technical victory.

References 

Nations at the 2018 Asian Games
2018
Asian Games